Tessie is an EP by Dropkick Murphys released in 2004.  It features two covers of the official anthem of the Boston Red Sox, "Tessie". Among the songs included on the CD, only "The Burden (live on WBCN)"  and "Tessie (Old Timey Baseball Version)" appear exclusively on this release. "Fields of Athenry" was previously released on Blackout, "Nutty", the song most associated with the Boston Bruins ice hockey team, which is also known as "Nutrocker", was released later on Singles Collection, Volume 2, a rarities compilation album and "Tessie" was a bonus track on their next album, The Warrior's Code, which also included a studio recorded version of "The Burden". The music video for "Tessie" is included on the enhanced portion of this EP.

Track listing

References

Dropkick Murphys albums
2004 EPs
Hellcat Records EPs